Ukarumpa is an intentional international community that is the main centre for SIL-PNG, located in the Eastern Highlands Province of Papua New Guinea. The population consists of a variety of paid staff and volunteer staff who live nearby. The centre was established in 1957. The current population is approximately 600. It is at an elevation of approximately 1600 m (5300 feet) above sea level.

History

Jim Dean was the founding Director of the Summer Institute of Linguistics in the (then) United Nations mandated Australian Trust Territory of New Guinea and remained as Director until he was reassigned to establish the S.I.L. operations in India in the mid-1960s.

The  had been the Peacock Plantation, a failed commercial venture. Before that, however, it was a plot of land that was used as the tribal war lands of the nearby tribes (and traditional enemies), the Gadsup and Tairora. Because the land was vacant in the mid-1950s, and only a portion of it, near the Ba'e river, was suitable for gardens, the Australian administrators offered it as one of several potential sites for the SIL base of operations.

Originally the land was open kunai (a type of waist-high grass with sharp-edged leaves) with few trees and no development.  The members built homes and planted trees which continue to attract bird life.  All of the buildings and roads were built by mission volunteers with financial donations from churches and individuals in their home countries. 

The function of Ukarumpa is to serve as an operations base for translators, linguists, literacy specialists, teachers and other professionals, who are mainly volunteer workers with SIL.  SIL International is an organisation that places a strong emphasis on linguistic research and Bible translation.

Geography

Ukarumpa is located on the Ba'e River. The Ba'e originates upstream from Ukarumpa and runs through the Gadsup area on to Kainantu. The climate is Equatorial Highland; there are cool days and nights, with daily afternoon rains between November and March.

The flora are primarily evergreen trees (Pine, Eucalyptus, Casuarina); there are also coffee plantations nearby, and kunai grass-covered hills.

Airfield
The settlement has its own air strip, Aiyura Airport, home to a fleet of STOL aircraft operated by SIL.

See also
 Ukarumpa International School

References

External links
 Ukarumpa International School website
 SIL PNG Website on PNG languages
 SIL PNG

Populated places in Eastern Highlands Province